Aller Park (also known as Aller) was a village in Devon, England, southeast of the town of Newton Abbot. The name is shared with the Aller Brook, which joins the River Teign at Newton Abbot.

Today it is a suburb of the town, within Newton Abbot civil parish.

References

Villages in Devon
Newton Abbot